Lars Eliasson  (December 8, 1914 – June 5, 2002) was a Swedish politician. He was a member of the Centre Party. He was the party's first vice chairman 1957-69 and a member of the Parliament of Sweden 1952–1970. For a short time in 1957, he was a minister in the Government of Sweden, in the Second cabinet of Erlander.

He is the father of the later Member of Parliament Anna Eliasson.

1914 births
2002 deaths
Governors of Kronoberg County
Government ministers of Sweden
Members of the Andra kammaren
Members of the Riksdag from the Centre Party (Sweden)